Mundrothuruth is a 2016 Malayalam feature film directed by Manu. Cinematography done by Pratap P Nair. Editor Manoj Kannoth. Lead roles: Indrans, Alencier, Abhija, Anil Nedumangad, Jason Chacko. The film was released on 11 November 2016 in India in two theaters

Awards
 2016: Aravindan Puraskaram for the best debut filmmaker
 2015: John Abraham Award for Best Malayalam Film

References

External links

2016 films
2010s Malayalam-language films